The 2016 All-Ireland Senior Camogie Championship – known as the Liberty Insurance All-Ireland Senior Camogie Championship for sponsorship reasons – is the premier inter-county senior camogie competition.

The winners receive the O'Duffy Cup.

The championship began on 18 June.

Teams

Eleven county teams compete in the Senior Championship (tier 1). Sixteen lower-ranked county teams plus the second teams of tier 1 counties compete in the Intermediate (tier 2) and Junior (tier 3) Championships.

Format

Group Stage

The eleven teams are drawn into one group of six and one group of five. All the teams play each other once. Three points are awarded for a win and one for a draw.

Knock-out stage

The two group runners-up and the two third-placed teams play in two quarter-finals.
The two group winners and the two quarter-final winners play in two semi-finals.
The semi-final winners contest the 2016 All-Ireland Senior Camogie Championship Final

Group stage

Group 1

Table

Tie-Breaker

If only two teams are level on league points -
 The team that won the head-to-head match is ranked first
 If this game was a draw, score difference (total scored minus total conceded in all games) is used to rank the teams
 If score difference is identical, total scored is used to rank the teams
 If still identical, a play-off is required
If three or more teams are level on league points, score difference is used to rank the teams.

Rounds 1 to 5

Round 1

Round 2

Round 3

Round 4

Round 5

Group 2

Table

Rounds 1 to 5

Round 1

Round 2

Round 3

Round 4

Round 5

Knock-out Stage

All-Ireland Quarter-Finals

The second team in group 1 plays the third team in group 2 and the third team in group 1 plays the second team in group 2. All matches are knock-out.

All-Ireland Semi-Finals

The winners of groups 1 and 2 play the winners of the two quarter-finals. All matches are knock-out

All-Ireland final

References

External links
 Camogie Association

2016
2016
All-Ireland Senior Camogie Championship